The Marlow-Hunter 31 is an American sailboat that was designed by Glenn Henderson as a cruiser and first built in 2015.

The design is sometimes confused with the 1983 Hunter 31 and the 2006 Hunter 31-2, which was also marketed as the Hunter 31.

Production
The design was built by Hunter Marine in the United States, starting in 2015 and remained in production through 2019.

Design
The Marlow-Hunter 31 is a recreational keelboat, built predominantly of fiberglass. The hull and deck and made from a vinyl ester resin with continuous reinforcement fibers, reinforced with Nida honeycomb cores and Kevlar in the forward hull for collision protection. It has a fractional sloop B&R rig, a mainsheet traveler mounted on a stainless steel arch, a nearly plumb stem, a reverse transom with a fold-down swimming platform and folding ladder, an internally mounted spade-type rudder controlled by a laterally-tilting wheel and a fixed fin keel or shoal draft keel. With standard fin keel it displaces  and carries  of ballast, while the shoal draft model displaces  and carries  of ballast.

The steering wheel can be set in port, center or starboard positions by use of a foot locking lever, as desired by the helmsman. This provides the advantages of a dual-wheel configuration, but occupies less cockpit space. The wheel also folds when not in use.

A sail drive is also optional.

Factory standard equipment includes a teak interior, Corian countertops, microwave oven, refrigerator, freezer, two-burner propane stove and oven, fully enclosed head with separate shower, LED lighting, knotmeter, depth sounder. A roller furling jib and mast-furling mainsail are optional.

Operational history
Writing for Sailing magazine in March 2015, famed yacht designer Robert Perry, was not impressed with the styling, describing this genre of boat "as looking like 'the box the boat came in.'" He describes the compromises, "It's not a bad trend if interior volume is what you are after. The new Marlow-Hunter 31 has an interior that would have been impressive even on a 40-footer 30 years ago. For a lot of buyers, interior comfort trumps performance. But in the hands of a skilled designer, performance can still be attained. Maybe not race boat performance, but respectable cruising boat performance is possible." He concluded with faint praise for the design, "I think this would be a great boat to introduce a young family to the joys of sailing and cruising."

Sven Donaldson, writing in Pacific Yacht Magazine in May 2015, concluded, "For a sailboat 
that fits in a 32-foot slip, it’s hard to envision a more spacious, liveable package than the new MH-31. It’s not for everyone, of course. There will be some who prefer a stronger bias toward the sailing side of the equation. On the other hand, it’s certainly no slouch under sail."

Great Lakes Boating magazine published a review in the summer of 2015, saying, "The Marlow-Hunter 31 uses a well-proven hull design to rival most 34-foot models.  The 30-foot foot waterline outclasses most boats,  and when combined with her Henderson/Marlow chined hull, it offers off-shore stability and performance that few can match. At low angles of heel and as the wind freshens, the Marlow/Henderson hull provides superior stability and performance."

In a review in Canadian Yachting in May 2016, Simon Hill, praised the interior accommodations. Of the sailing qualities, he wrote, "When some breeze appeared it was easy to deploy the furling sails, and we were quickly able to get the boat moving at nearly three knots in wind that was topping out at about four knots, tacking upwind without difficulty despite the light conditions. The true test of a slippery hull form is how well it accelerates, and the MH 31 proved quick to build speed in even the slightest pull, and equally quick to respond to the helm."

See also
List of sailing boat types

Similar sailboats
Allmand 31
Beneteau 31
Catalina 310
Corvette 31
Douglas 31
Herreshoff 31
Hunter 31
Hunter 310
Hunter 320
Niagara 31
Roue 20
Tanzer 31

References

External links

Keelboats
2010s sailboat type designs
Sailing yachts
Sailboat type designs by Glenn Henderson
Sailboat types built by Hunter Marine